Karen Huitfeldt, née  Werenskiold (3 June 1700-1778) was a Danish courtier.  

She was born at  Sarpsborg in  Østfold as the daughter of the nobleman Niels Werenschiold til Hafslund (1669–1741) and Elisabeth deTønsberg (1673–1742). In 1719, she married nobleman Hartvig Huitfeldt (1677–1748) who was Lieutenant General and commander at Fredrikstad Fortress in Østfold from 1740.

Karen Huitfeldt was given the Ordre de l'Union Parfaite in 1755 and served as Chief Court Mistress (overhoffmesterinne) to Queen Juliana Maria  from 1757-1767.

References

1700 births
1778 deaths
People from Østfold
Danish ladies-in-waiting
18th-century Danish people
18th-century Danish nobility
Ordre de l'Union Parfaite
Huitfeldt  family
People from Sarpsborg